Mutant City Blues is a role-playing game published by Pelgrane Press in 2009.

Description
Mutant City Blues is one of the games to use the GUMSHOE System. In a world where 1% of the population has gained mutant powers, police procedure has changed forever. The characters are members of the Heightened Crime Investigation Unit that specializes in crimes involving the mutant community.

Publication history
Robin Laws designed Mutant City Blues (2009) for Pelgrane Press's GUMSHOE system.

Reception

References

British role-playing games
Campaign settings
Pelgrane Press games
Robin Laws games
Role-playing games introduced in 2009
Science fiction role-playing games
Superhero role-playing games